Nearby (previously named WNM Live / Who's Near Me) was a location-based social networking service.  Nearby was originally launched in June 2010.. The site closed in September 2021 following a significant data break.

Background 

Nearby was founded by Brian Hamachek. The company is located in Palo Alto, California. The company is a member of the Microsoft Bizspark program. On November 11, 2013, Nearby was accepted into the Fall 2013 session of the Stanford StartX accelerator.  In January 2014, the company name was changed from WNM Live to Nearby.

Nearby uses the GPS unit in a phone or computer to determine your location and returns a list of users nearby based on relative proximity. Unlike several other location-based social networks such as Skout, WhosHere, and Grindr, Nearby explicitly declares that the service is not intended to be used for dating purposes.

Platforms and users 

A Windows Mobile 6 application was released on 6/2010.  It was followed by a Windows Phone 7 application which was released on 10/2010.  A web and mobile web portal for the service was launched 4/2011.  An iPhone application was released 1/2012.  A Windows 8 application was released in 5/2012.  An Android application was released in the first half of 2013. The service has a combined membership of just over 5 million users.  The highest percentage of users were located in the United States, United Kingdom, and India (in that order).  An Android app was released in January 2015.

Awards and recognition 

The Windows Phone application was selected at the 2011 Microsoft Worldwide Partner Conference as the 2nd best application in the Marketplace.

Nearby was selected by Microsoft as a Bizspark Featured Startup on April 30, 2013.

The Nearby app for Windows Phone was runner-up in Nokia's Create competition within the NFC category.

Trademark dispute 

Nearby was officially known as Who's Near Me until 6/2012.  In 2011, WhosHere, a competitor in the location-based social network landscape, approached Who's Near Me and requested that they change their name.  They alleged that the name was too similar to their own product's name of WhosHere and that it constituted trademark infringement.  Although Who's Near Me originally agreed to change the name of the company, they continued to use Who's Near Me.  In 5/2012, WhosHere filed a legal complaint of trademark infringement, unfair competition, cybersquatting, and breach of contract against the company.  News of the lawsuit was made public when Nearby CEO Brian Hamachek wrote a blog post about the matter in which he made a number of allegations against WhosHere.  The blog post was picked up by a number of media organizations, including TechCrunch.  Hamachek eventually agreed to change the name of the company to WNM Live (and later changed again to Nearby for unrelated reasons) and posted a joint statement written by both WNM Live and WhosHere.

See also 
 Location-based service

References

External links 
Official website

Geosocial networking
Proprietary cross-platform software
American social networking websites